Brett Steven Custer (born 1 April 1968) is a former professional tennis player from Australia.

Biography
Custer, the son of Noel and Dawn, grew up in the Sydney suburb of Normanhurst. His family are distant relatives of the famed General Custer.

As a junior he held national titles in the Under 12, 14, 16 and 18 categories. Custer, who left school to focus on his burgeoning tennis career, was nurtured by John Newcombe and Tony Roche as part of the Custom Credit Operation scheme. While still only 15 he featured in the men's doubles draw at the 1983 Australian Open with fellow junior David Macpherson. The same pair would team up to win the boys' doubles event at the 1985 Australian Open, having been losing finalists the previous year. They defeated Czechoslovakians Petr Korda and Cyril Suk in the final. At the same tournament the teenagers also made it to the round of 16 in the men's doubles. Their run included a win over the 10th seeded pair, Shlomo Glickstein and Shahar Perkiss from Israel, before it was ended by the top seeds in the draw, Joakim Nyström and Mats Wilander.

He played professionally on the Grand Prix (now ATP Tour) and Challenger circuits with limited success. At the 1986 Wimbledon Championships he won his way through qualifying, then was beaten by Johan Kriek in the first round. His best result on tour in singles was a second round appearance at the 1988 Australian Indoor Tennis Championships in Sydney. As a doubles player he made it into the world's top 200, won three Challenger titles and was a semi-finalist with Des Tyson at the Brisbane Grand Prix tournament in 1989. He played in the men's doubles draw at the Australian Open a total of five times. His only appearance in singles came as a wildcard at the 1989 Australian Open, where he lost to Pat Cash in the opening round.

Now based in the United States, Custer is the Tennis Director at Stone Creek, a club and spa in Covington, Louisiana.

ATP Challenger and ITF Futures finals

Doubles: 4 (3–1)

Junior Grand Slam finals

Doubles: 2 (1 title, 1 runner-up)

References

External links
 
 

1968 births
Living people
Australian male tennis players
Australian Open (tennis) junior champions
Tennis players from Sydney
Australian expatriate sportspeople in the United States
Grand Slam (tennis) champions in boys' doubles
20th-century Australian people
21st-century Australian people